Pettus may refer to:

People with the surname
 Pettus baronets, a baronetcy of England
 Senator Pettus (disambiguation), several senators

 Augustine Pettus (16th century), forebear of the Pettus baronets
 Bill Pettus (1884–1924), U.S. baseball player
 Dedra Pettus (died 1981)
 Edmund Pettus (1821–1907), a Confederate Brigadier General in the American Civil War, and later U.S. politician
 Horatio Pettus, several of the Pettus baronets
 John Pettus (disambiguation), several people
 Phillip Pettus, U.S. politician
 Terry Pettus (1904–1984), a U.S. journalist
 Thomas Pettus, several of the Pettus baronets
 Thomas Pettus (17th century), the High Sheriff of Norfolk for whom the Pettus baronets of Norfolk, England were created 
 Viola Pettus (born 1886), a U.S. nurse and African-American activist
 William Grymes Pettus (1794–1867), a U.S. politician

 George Pettus Raney (1845–1911), U.S. politician, attorney, judge
 Horatio Pettus Mackintosh Berney-Ficklin (1892–1961), British army officer
 Stephen Pettus Read (1841–1917), U.S. politician
 Walter Pettus Gewin (1908–1981), U.S. judge
 William Pettus Hobby, Sr. (1878–1964), U.S. publisher and politician
 William Pettus Hobby, Jr. (born 1932), U.S. politician

Places
 Pettus, Arkansas, United States; an unincorporated community
 Pettus, Texas, United States; a census-designated-place
 Pettus Independent School District, Texas, USA
 Pettus, West Virginia, United States
 Terry Pettus Park, Seattle, Washington, United States

 Pettus Glacier, Trinity Peninsula, Antarctic Peninsula, Antarctica

Other uses
 Edmund Pettus Bridge, Selma, Alabama, USA; over the Alabama River; notable in civil rights history and named after the Confederate Brigadier General
 Pettus High School, Pettus, Texas, USA
 Four Locust Farm or Pettus Dairy Farm, Keysville, Charlotte County, Virginia. USA; an NRHP-listed home

See also

 Pettusville, Alabama, United States